Community First Fund is a community development financial institution in Pennsylvania which was founded in 1992. The organization provides loans, business training, and one-on-one counseling to entrepreneurs, affordable housing and commercial real estate developers, and community groups in under-served communities.

Community First Fund offers seven loan products ranging in size from approximately $10,000 to $500,000+, depending on the purpose and qualifications of the applicants. The organization is a SBA guaranteed lender and serves 13 counties in Central Pennsylvania. Community First Fund has had over 700 loans recipients, totaling more than $22 million.

References

External links
Community First Fund website

Microfinance organizations
Community development financial institutions
Organizations based in Pennsylvania